Charles, Dead or Alive (French: Charles mort ou vif) is a 1969 Swiss drama film directed by Alain Tanner.

Plot
Produced in reaction to the Protests of 1968, it describes the mid-life crisis of a businessman who decides to drop out of mainstream capitalist life and takes up with couple living a marginal existence on the fringe of society. Meanwhile his daughter has been caught up in a wave of student protest. According to Alison Smith, the Swiss director Tanner translated the May 1968 events in France to Switzerland, hoping for a similar upheaval in his own country, and in the film creating an imaginary student revolt in a society that in reality did not experience the turmoil or revolutionary possibility facing France in May 1968.

Cast
 François Simon 
 Marcel Robert 
 Marie-Claire Dufour
 Jean-Luc Bideau

Reception

Awards
1969 Locarno International Film Festival
Won: Golden Leopard

References

External links

1970 drama films
1970 films
Swiss black-and-white films
Films directed by Alain Tanner
Golden Leopard winners
Swiss drama films
1970s French-language films
French-language Swiss films